Bednarka  (Bodnarka) is a village in the administrative district of Gmina Lipinki, within Gorlice County, Lesser Poland Voivodeship, in southern Poland.

The village has a population of 172.

References

Villages in Gorlice County